

Events

Pre-1600
69 – The Roman legions on the Rhine refuse to declare their allegiance to Galba, instead proclaiming their legate, Aulus Vitellius, as emperor. 
 250 – Emperor Decius orders everyone in the Roman Empire (except Jews) to make sacrifices to the Roman gods.
1521 – Pope Leo X excommunicates Martin Luther in the papal bull Decet Romanum Pontificem.

1601–1900
1653 – By the Coonan Cross Oath, the Eastern Church in India cuts itself off from colonial Portuguese tutelage.
1749 – Benning Wentworth issues the first of the New Hampshire Grants, leading to the establishment of Vermont.
  1749   – The first issue of Berlingske, Denmark's oldest continually operating newspaper, is published.
1777 – American General George Washington defeats British General Lord Cornwallis at the Battle of Princeton.
1815 – Austria, the United Kingdom, and France form a secret defensive alliance against Prussia and Russia.
1833 – Captain James Onslow, in the Clio, reasserts British sovereignty over the Falkland Islands.
1848 – Joseph Jenkins Roberts is sworn in as the first president of Liberia.
1861 – American Civil War: Delaware votes not to secede from the United States.
1868 – Meiji Restoration in Japan: The Tokugawa shogunate is abolished; agents of Satsuma and Chōshū seize power.
1870 – Construction work begins on the Brooklyn Bridge in New York, United States.
1871 – In the Battle of Bapaume, an engagement in the Franco-Prussian War, General Louis Faidherbe's forces bring about a Prussian retreat.
1885 – Sino-French War: Beginning of the Battle of Núi Bop.

1901–present
1911 – A magnitude 7.7 earthquake destroys the city of Almaty in Russian Turkestan.
  1911   – A gun battle in the East End of London leaves two dead. It sparked a political row over the involvement of then-Home Secretary Winston Churchill.
1913 – An Atlantic coast storm sets the lowest confirmed barometric pressure reading for a non-tropical system in the continental United States.
  1913   – First Balkan War: Greece completes its capture of the eastern Aegean island of Chios, as the last Ottoman forces on the island surrender.
1920 – Over 640 are killed after a magnitude 6.4 earthquake strikes the Mexican states Puebla and Veracruz.
1933 – Minnie D. Craig becomes the first woman elected as Speaker of the North Dakota House of Representatives, the first woman to hold a Speaker position anywhere in the United States.
1944 – World War II: US flying ace Major Greg "Pappy" Boyington is shot down in his Vought F4U Corsair by Captain Masajiro Kawato flying a Mitsubishi A6M Zero.
1946 – Popular Canadian American jockey George Woolf dies in a freak accident during a race; the annual George Woolf Memorial Jockey Award is created to honor him.
1947 – Proceedings of the U.S. Congress are televised for the first time.
1949 – The Bangko Sentral ng Pilipinas, the central bank of the Philippines, is established.
1953 – Frances P. Bolton and her son, Oliver from Ohio, become the first mother and son to serve simultaneously in the U.S. Congress.
1956 – A fire damages the top part of the Eiffel Tower.
1957 – The Hamilton Watch Company introduces the first electric watch.
1958 – The West Indies Federation is formed.
1959 – Alaska is admitted as the 49th U.S. state.
1961 – Cold War: After a series of economic retaliations against one another, the United States severs diplomatic relations with Cuba.
  1961   – The SL-1 nuclear reactor, near Idaho Falls, Idaho, is destroyed by a steam explosion in the only reactor incident in the United States to cause immediate fatalities.
  1961   – A protest by agricultural workers in Baixa de Cassanje, Portuguese Angola, turns into a revolt, opening the Angolan War of Independence, the first of the Portuguese Colonial Wars.
  1961   – Aero Flight 311 crashes into the forest in Kvevlax, Finland, killing 25 people.
1962 – Pope John XXIII excommunicates Fidel Castro.
1976 – The International Covenant on Economic, Social and Cultural Rights, adopted by the United Nations General Assembly, comes into force.
1977 – Apple Computer is incorporated.
1987 – Varig Flight 797 crashes near Akouré in the Ivory Coast, resulting in 50 deaths.
1990 – United States invasion of Panama: Manuel Noriega, former leader of Panama, surrenders to American forces.
1992 – CommutAir Flight 4821 crashes on approach to Adirondack Regional Airport, in Saranac Lake, New York, killing two people. 
1993 – In Moscow, Russia, George H. W. Bush and Boris Yeltsin sign the second Strategic Arms Reduction Treaty (START).
1994 – Baikal Airlines Flight 130 crashes near Mamoney, Irkutsk, Russia, resulting in 125 deaths.
1999 – The Mars Polar Lander is launched by NASA.
2002 – Israeli–Palestinian conflict: Israeli forces seize the Palestinian freighter Karine A in the Red Sea, finding 50 tons of weapons.
2004 – Flash Airlines Flight 604 crashes into the Red Sea, resulting in 148 deaths, making it one of the deadliest aviation accidents in Egyptian history.
2009 – The first block of the blockchain of the decentralized payment system Bitcoin, called the Genesis block, is established by the creator of the system, Satoshi Nakamoto.
2015 – Boko Haram militants destroy the entire town of Baga in north-east Nigeria, starting the Baga massacre and killing as many as 2,000 people.
2016 – In response to the execution of Nimr al-Nimr, Iran ends its diplomatic relations with Saudi Arabia.
2018 – For the first time in history, all five major storm surge gates in the Netherlands are closed simultaneously in the wake of a storm.
2019 – Chang'e 4 makes the first soft landing on the far side of the Moon, deploying the Yutu-2 lunar rover.
2020 – Iranian General Qasem Soleimani is killed by an American airstrike near Baghdad International Airport, igniting global concerns of a potential armed conflict.
2023 – Singapore's Jurong Bird Park permanently closes.

Births

Pre-1600
106 BC – Cicero, Roman philosopher, lawyer, and politician (d. 43 BC)
1509 – Gian Girolamo Albani, Italian cardinal (d. 1591)

1601–1900
1611 – James Harrington, English political theorist (d. 1677)
1698 – Pietro Metastasio, Italian poet and songwriter (d. 1782)
1710 – Richard Gridley, American soldier and engineer (d. 1796)
1722 – Fredrik Hasselqvist, Swedish biologist and explorer (d. 1752)
1731 – Angelo Emo, Venetian admiral and statesman (d. 1792)
1760 – Veerapandiya Kattabomman, Indian ruler (d. 1799)
1775 – Francis Caulfeild, 2nd Earl of Charlemont (d. 1863)
1778 – Antoni Melchior Fijałkowski, Polish archbishop (d. 1861)
1793 – Lucretia Mott, American activist (d. 1880)
1802 – Charles Pelham Villiers, English lawyer and politician (d. 1898)
1803 – Douglas William Jerrold, English journalist and playwright (d. 1857)
1806 – Henriette Sontag, German soprano and actress (d. 1854)
1810 – Antoine Thomson d'Abbadie, French geographer, ethnologist, linguist, and astronomer (d. 1897)
1816 – Samuel C. Pomeroy, American businessman and politician (d. 1891)
1819 – Charles Piazzi Smyth, Italian-Scottish astronomer and academic (d. 1900)
1831 – Savitribai Phule, Indian poet, educator, and activist (d. 1897)
1836 – Sakamoto Ryōma, Japanese samurai and rebel leader (d. 1867)
1840 – Father Damien, Flemish priest and missionary (d. 1889)
1847 – Ettore Marchiafava, Italian physician (d. 1935)
1853 – Sophie Elkan, Swedish writer (d. 1921)
1855 – Hubert Bland, English businessman (d. 1914)
1861 – Ernest Renshaw, English tennis player (d. 1899)
  1861   – William Renshaw, English tennis player (d. 1904)
1862 – Matthew Nathan, English soldier and politician, 13th Governor of Queensland (d. 1939)
1865 – Henry Lytton, English actor (d. 1936)
1870 – Henry Handel Richardson, Australian-English author (d. 1946)
1873 – Ichizō Kobayashi, Japanese businessman and art collector, founded the Hankyu Hanshin Holdings (d. 1957)
1875 – Alexandros Diomidis, Greek banker and politician, 145th Prime Minister of Greece (d. 1950)
1876 – Wilhelm Pieck, German carpenter and politician, 1st President of the German Democratic Republic (d. 1960)
1877 – Josephine Hull, American actress (d. 1957)
1880 – Francis Browne, Irish Jesuit priest and photographer (d. 1960)
1883 – Clement Attlee, English soldier, lawyer, and politician, Prime Minister of the United Kingdom (d. 1967)
  1883   – Duncan Gillis, Canadian discus thrower and hammer thrower (d. 1963)
1884 – Raoul Koczalski, Polish pianist and composer (d. 1948)
1885 – Harry Elkins Widener, American businessman (d. 1912)
1886 – John Gould Fletcher, American poet and author (d. 1950)
  1886   – Arthur Mailey, Australian cricketer (d. 1967)
1887 – August Macke, German-French painter (d. 1914)
1892 – J.R.R. Tolkien, English writer, poet, and philologist (d. 1973)
1894 – ZaSu Pitts, American actress (d. 1963)
1897 – Eithne Coyle, Irish republican activist, (d. 1985)
  1897   – Marion Davies, American actress and comedian (d. 1961)
1898 – Carolyn Haywood, American author and illustrator (d. 1990)
1900 – Donald J. Russell, American businessman (d. 1985)

1901–present
1901 – Ngô Đình Diệm, Vietnamese lawyer and politician, 1st President of the Republic of Vietnam (d. 1963)
1905 – Dante Giacosa, Italian engineer (d. 1996)
  1905   – Anna May Wong, American actress (d. 1961)
1907 – Ray Milland, Welsh-American actor and director (d. 1986)
1909 – Victor Borge, Danish-American pianist and conductor (d. 2000)
1910 – Frenchy Bordagaray, American baseball player and manager (d. 2000)
1910 – John Sturges, American director and producer (d. 1992)
1912 – Federico Borrell García, Spanish soldier (d. 1936)
  1912   – Renaude Lapointe, Canadian journalist and politician (d. 2002)
  1912   – Armand Lohikoski, American-Finnish actor, director, and screenwriter (d. 2005)
1915 – Jack Levine, American painter and soldier (d. 2010)
1916 – Betty Furness, American actress and television journalist (d. 1994)
  1916   – Fred Haas, American golfer (d. 2004)
1917 – Albert Mol, Dutch author and actor (d. 2002)
  1917   – Roger Williams Straus, Jr., American journalist and publisher, co-founded Farrar, Straus and Giroux (d. 2004)
1919 – Herbie Nichols, American pianist and composer (d. 1963)
1920 – Siegfried Buback, German lawyer and politician, Attorney General of Germany (d. 1977)
1921 – Isabella Bashmakova, Russian historian of mathematics (d. 2005)
1922 – Bill Travers, English actor, director, and screenwriter (d. 1994)
1923 – Hank Stram, American football coach and sportscaster (d. 2005)
1924 – Otto Beisheim, German businessman and philanthropist, founded Metro AG (d. 2013)
  1924   – André Franquin, Belgian author and illustrator (d. 1997)
  1924   – Nell Rankin, American soprano and educator (d. 2005)
  1924   – Enzo Cozzolini, Italian football player (d. 1962)
1925 – Jill Balcon, English actress (d. 2009)
1926 – W. Michael Blumenthal, American economist and politician, 64th United States Secretary of the Treasury
  1926   – George Martin, English composer, conductor, and producer (d. 2016)
  1928   – Abdul Rahman Ya'kub, Malaysian lawyer and politician, 3rd Chief Minister of Sarawak (d. 2015)
1929 – Sergio Leone, Italian director, producer, and screenwriter (d. 1989)
  1929   – Ernst Mahle, German-Brazilian composer and conductor
  1929   – Gordon Moore, American businessman, co-founder of Intel Corporation
1930 – Robert Loggia, American actor and director (d. 2015)
1932 – Eeles Landström, Finnish pole vaulter and politician
1933 – Geoffrey Bindman, English lawyer
  1933   – Anne Stevenson, American-English poet and author (d. 2020)
1934 – Marpessa Dawn, American-French actress, singer, and dancer (d. 2008)
  1934   – Carla Anderson Hills, American lawyer and politician, 5th United States Secretary of Housing and Urban Development
1935 – Raymond Garneau, Canadian businessman and politician
1937 – Glen A. Larson, American director, producer, and screenwriter, created Battlestar Galactica (d. 2014)
1938 – Robin Butler, Baron Butler of Brockwell, English academic and politician
  1938   – K. Ganeshalingam, Sri Lankan accountant and politician, Mayor of Colombo (d. 2006)
1939 – Arik Einstein, Israeli singer-songwriter and actor (d. 2013)
  1939   – Bobby Hull, Canadian ice hockey player (d. 2023)
1940 – Leo de Berardinis, Italian actor and director (d. 2008)
  1940   – Bernard Blaut, Polish footballer and coach (d. 2007)
1941 – Malcolm Dick, New Zealand rugby player
1942 – John Marsden, Australian lawyer and activist (d. 2006)
  1942   – John Thaw, English actor and producer, played Inspector Morse (d. 2002)
1943 – Van Dyke Parks, American singer-songwriter, musician, composer, author, and actor
1944 – Blanche d'Alpuget, Australian author
  1944   – Doreen Massey, English geographer and political activist (d. 2016)
1945 – Stephen Stills, American singer-songwriter, guitarist, and producer
1946 – John Paul Jones, English bass player, songwriter, and producer
  1946   – Michalis Kritikopoulos, Greek footballer (d. 2002)
1947 – Fran Cotton, English rugby player
  1947   – Zulema, American singer-songwriter (d. 2013)
1948 – Ian Nankervis, Australian footballer
1950 – Victoria Principal, American actress and businesswoman
  1950   – Linda Steiner, American journalist and academic
  1950   – Vesna Vulović, Serbian plane crash survivor and Guinness World Record holder (d. 2016)
1951 – Linda Dobbs, English lawyer and judge
  1951   – Gary Nairn, Australian surveyor and politician, 14th Special Minister of State
1952 – Esperanza Aguirre, Spanish civil servant and politician, 3rd President of the Community of Madrid
  1952   – Gianfranco Fini, Italian journalist and politician, Italian Minister of Foreign Affairs
  1952   – Jim Ross, American professional wrestling commentator
1953 – Justin Fleming, Australian playwright and author
  1953   – Mohammed Waheed Hassan, Maldivian educator and politician, 5th President of the Maldives
  1953   – Peter Taylor, English footballer and manager
1956 – Mel Gibson, American-Australian actor, director, producer, and screenwriter
1960 – Russell Spence, English racing driver
1962 – Darren Daulton, American baseball player (d. 2017)
  1962   – Gavin Hastings, Scottish rugby player
1963 – Stewart Hosie, Scottish businessman and politician
  1963   – Aamer Malik, Pakistani cricketer
  1963   – Alex Wheatle, English author and playwright
  1963   – New Jack, retired professional wrestler (d. 2021)
1964 – Bruce LaBruce, Canadian director, producer, and screenwriter
  1964   – Cheryl Miller, American basketball player and coach
1966 – Chetan Sharma, Indian cricketer
1969 – Jarmo Lehtinen, Finnish racing driver
  1969   – Michael Schumacher, German racing driver
  1969   – Gerda Weissensteiner, Italian luger and bobsledder
1971 – Cory Cross, Canadian ice hockey player and coach
  1971   – Lee Il-hwa, South Korean actress
1974 – Robert-Jan Derksen, Dutch golfer
  1974   – Alessandro Petacchi, Italian cyclist
1975 – Jason Marsden, American actor
  1975   – Danica McKellar, American actress and mathematician
  1975   – Thomas Bangalter, French DJ, musician, and producer
1976 – Angelos Basinas, Greek footballer
  1976   – Nicholas Gonzalez, American actor and producer
1977 – Lee Bowyer, English footballer and coach
  1977   – A. J. Burnett, American baseball player
1978 – Dimitra Kalentzou, Greek basketball player
1980 – Bryan Clay, American decathlete
  1980   – Angela Ruggiero, American ice hockey player
  1980   – David Tyree, American football player
  1980   – Kurt Vile, American singer-songwriter, guitarist, and producer
  1980   – Mary Wineberg, American sprinter
1981 – Eli Manning, American football player
1982 – Peter Clarke, English footballer
  1982   – Lasse Nilsson, Swedish footballer
  1982   – Park Ji-yoon, South Korean singer and actress
1984 – Billy Mehmet, English-Irish footballer
1985 – Linas Kleiza, Lithuanian basketball player
  1985   – Evan Moore, American football player
1986 – Dana Hussain, Iraqi sprinter
  1986   – Greg Nwokolo, Indonesian footballer
  1986   – Dmitry Starodubtsev, Russian pole vaulter
1987 – Reto Berra, Swiss professional ice hockey goaltender
  1987   – Kim Ok-bin, South Korean actress and singer
1988 – Ikechi Anya, Scottish-Nigerian footballer
  1988   – Matt Frattin, Canadian ice hockey player
1989 – Kōhei Uchimura, Japanese artistic gymnast
1990 – Yoichiro Kakitani, Japanese footballer
1991 – Jerson Cabral, Dutch footballer
  1991   – Özgür Çek, Turkish footballer
  1991   – Sébastien Faure, French footballer
  1991   – Dane Gagai, Australian rugby league player
  1991   – Goo Hara, South Korean singer and actress (d. 2019)
1994 – Isaquias Queiroz, Brazilian sprint canoeist
1995 – Kim Jisoo, South Korean singer and actress
  1995   – Kim Seol-hyun, South Korean singer and actress
1996 – Florence Pugh, English actress
1997 – Kyron McMaster, British Virgin Islands hurdler
2001 – Deni Avdija, Israeli-Serbian basketball player
2003 – Kyle Rittenhouse, American conservative personality
  2003   – Greta Thunberg, Swedish environmental activist

Deaths

Pre-1600
 236 – Anterus, pope of the Catholic Church
 323 – Yuan of Yin, Chinese emperor (b. 276)
1027 – Fujiwara no Yukinari, Japanese calligrapher (b. 972)
1028 – Fujiwara no Michinaga, Japanese nobleman (b. 966)
1098 – Walkelin, Norman bishop of Winchester
1322 – Philip V, king of France (b. 1292)
1437 – Catherine of Valois, queen consort of Henry V (b. 1401)
1501 – Ali-Shir Nava'i, Turkic poet, linguist, and mystic (b. 1441)
1543 – Juan Rodríguez Cabrillo, Portuguese explorer and navigator (b. 1499)
1571 – Joachim II Hector, Elector of Brandenburg (b. 1505)

1601–1900
1641 – Jeremiah Horrocks, English astronomer and mathematician (b. 1618)
1656 – Mathieu Molé, French politician (b. 1584)
1670 – George Monck, 1st Duke of Albemarle, English general and politician, Lord Lieutenant of Ireland (b. 1608)
1701 – Louis I, prince of Monaco (b. 1642)
1705 – Luca Giordano, Italian painter and illustrator (b. 1634)
1743 – Ferdinando Galli-Bibiena, Italian painter and architect (b. 1657)
1777 – William Leslie, Scottish captain (b. 1751)
1779 – Claude Bourgelat, French surgeon and lawyer (b. 1712)
1785 – Baldassare Galuppi, Italian composer (b. 1706)
1795 – Josiah Wedgwood, English potter, founded the Wedgwood Company (b. 1730)
1826 – Louis-Gabriel Suchet, French general (b. 1770)
1871 – Kuriakose Elias Chavara, Indian priest and saint (b. 1805)
1875 – Pierre Larousse, French lexicographer and publisher (b. 1817)
1882 – William Harrison Ainsworth, English author (b. 1805)
1895 – James Merritt Ives, American lithographer and businessman, co-founded Currier and Ives (b. 1824)

1901–present
1903 – Alois Hitler, Austrian civil servant (b. 1837)
1911 – Alexandros Papadiamantis, Greek author and poet (b. 1851)
1915 – James Elroy Flecker, English poet, author, and playwright (b. 1884)
1916 – Grenville M. Dodge, American general and politician (b. 1831)
1922 – Wilhelm Voigt, German criminal (b. 1849)
1923 – Jaroslav Hašek, Czech journalist and author (b. 1883)
1927 – Carl David Tolmé Runge, German physicist and mathematician (b. 1856)
1931 – Joseph Joffre, French general (b. 1852)
1933 – Wilhelm Cuno, German lawyer and politician, Chancellor of Germany (b. 1876)
  1933   – Jack Pickford, Canadian-American actor, director, and producer (b. 1896)
1943 – Walter James, Australian lawyer and politician, 5th Premier of Western Australia (b. 1863)
1944 – Jurgis Baltrušaitis, Lithuanian poet, critic, and translator (b. 1873)
1945 – Edgar Cayce, American psychic and author (b. 1877)
  1945   – Ferdynand Antoni Ossendowski, Polish journalist and explorer (b. 1879)
1946 – William Joyce, American-British pro-Axis propaganda broadcaster (b. 1906)
1956 – Alexander Gretchaninov, Russian-American pianist and composer (b. 1864)
  1956   – Dimitrios Vergos, Greek wrestler, weightlifter, and shot putter (b. 1886)
  1956   – Joseph Wirth, German educator and politician, Chancellor of Germany (b. 1876)
1958 – Cafer Tayyar Eğilmez, Turkish general (b. 1877)
1959 – Edwin Muir, Scottish poet, author, and translator (b. 1887)
1960 – Eric P. Kelly, American journalist, author, and academic (b. 1884)
1962 – Hermann Lux, German footballer and manager (b. 1893)
1965 – Milton Avery, American painter (b. 1885)
1966 – Sammy Younge Jr., American civil rights activist (b. 1944)
1967 – Mary Garden, Scottish-American soprano and actress (b. 1874)
  1967   – Reginald Punnett, British scientist (b. 1875)
  1967   – Jack Ruby, American businessman and murderer (b. 1911)
1969 – Jean Focas, Greek-French astronomer (b. 1909)
  1969   – Tzavalas Karousos, Greek-French actor (b. 1904)
1970 – Gladys Aylward, English missionary and humanitarian (b. 1902)
1972 – Mohan Rakesh, Indian author and playwright (b. 1925)
1975 – Victor Kraft, Austrian philosopher from the Vienna Circle (b. 1880)
  1975   – James McCormack, American general (b. 1910)
1977 – William Gropper, American lithographer, cartoonist, and painter (b. 1897)
1979 – Conrad Hilton, American businessman, founded the Hilton Hotels & Resorts (b. 1887)
1980 – Joy Adamson, Austrian-Kenyan painter and conservationist (b. 1910)
  1980   – George Sutherland Fraser, Scottish poet and academic (b. 1915)
1981 – Princess Alice, Countess of Athlone (b. 1883)
1988 – Rose Ausländer, Ukrainian-German poet and author (b. 1901)
1989 – Sergei Sobolev, Russian mathematician and academic (b. 1909)
1992 – Judith Anderson, Australian actress (b. 1897)
2002 – Satish Dhawan, Indian engineer (b. 1920)
2003 – Sid Gillman, American football player and coach (b. 1911)
2005 – Koo Chen-fu, Taiwanese businessman and diplomat (b. 1917)
  2005   – Egidio Galea, Maltese Roman Catholic priest, missionary, and educator (b. 1918)
  2005   – Jyotindra Nath Dixit, Indian diplomat, 2nd Indian National Security Adviser (b. 1936)
  2006   – Bill Skate, Papua New Guinean politician, 5th Prime Minister of Papua New Guinea (b. 1954)
2007 – William Verity, Jr., American businessman and politician, 27th United States Secretary of Commerce (b. 1917)
2008 – Jimmy Stewart, Scottish racing driver (b. 1931)
  2008   – Choi Yo-sam, South Korean boxer (b. 1972)
2009 – Betty Freeman, American philanthropist and photographer (b. 1921)
  2009   – Pat Hingle, American actor (b. 1923)
  2009   – Hisayasu Nagata, Japanese politician (b. 1969)
2010 – Gustavo Becerra-Schmidt, Chilean-German composer and academic (b. 1925)
  2010   – Mary Daly, American theologian and scholar (b. 1928)
2012 – Vicar, Chilean cartoonist (b. 1934)
  2012   – Robert L. Carter, American lawyer and judge (b. 1917)
  2012   – Winifred Milius Lubell, American author and illustrator (b. 1914)
  2012   – Josef Škvorecký, Czech-Canadian author and publisher (b. 1924)
2013 – Alfie Fripp, English soldier and pilot (b. 1913)
  2013   – Ivan Mackerle, Czech cryptozoologist, explorer, and author (b. 1942)
  2013   – William Maxson, American general (b. 1930)
  2013   – Sergiu Nicolaescu, Romanian actor, director, and screenwriter (b. 1930)
2014 – Phil Everly, American singer and guitarist (b. 1939)
  2014   – George Goodman, American economist and author (b. 1930)
  2014   – Saul Zaentz, American film producer (b. 1921)
2015 – Martin Anderson, American economist and academic (b. 1936)
  2015   – Edward Brooke, American captain and politician, 47th Massachusetts Attorney General (b. 1919)
2016 – Paul Bley, Canadian-American pianist and composer (b. 1932)
  2016   – Peter Naur, Danish computer scientist, astronomer, and academic (b. 1928)
  2016   – Bill Plager, Canadian ice hockey player and coach (b. 1945)
  2016   – Igor Sergun, Russian general and diplomat (b. 1957)
2017 – H. S. Mahadeva Prasad, Indian politician (b. 1958)
2018 – Colin Brumby, Australian composer (b. 1933)
2019 – Herb Kelleher, American businessman, co-founder of Southwest Airlines (b. 1931)
2020 – Qasem Soleimani, Iranian major general, commander of the Iranian Quds Force (b. 1957)
2021 – Eric Jerome Dickey, American author (b. 1961)
2023 – Elena Huelva, Spanish cancer activist and influencer (b. 2002)

Holidays and observances
Anniversary of the 1966 Coup d'état (Burkina Faso)
 Christian feast day:
Daniel of Padua
Genevieve
Holy Name of Jesus
Kuriakose Elias Chavara (Syro-Malabar Catholic Church)
Pope Anterus
William Passavant (Episcopal Church)
January 3 (Eastern Orthodox liturgics)
Ministry of Religious Affairs Day (Indonesia)
Tamaseseri Festival (Hakozaki Shrine, Fukuoka, Japan)
 The tenth of the Twelve Days of Christmas (Western Christianity)

Notes
Perihelion, the point during the year when the Earth is closest to the Sun, occurs on or around this date. In the Northern Hemisphere, ignoring the effects of daylight saving time, the latest sunrise of the year occurs on or around this date.

References

External links

 BBC: On This Day
 
 Historical Events on January 3

Days of the year
January